Carodista fushanensis is a moth in the family Lecithoceridae. It was described by Kyu-Tek Park in 2000. It is found in Taiwan.

References

Moths described in 2000
Carodista